Carpet snake may refer to:

 Morelia spilota variegata, a.k.a. the Northwestern carpet python, a harmless subspecies found in New Guinea and Australia in northwestern Western Australia and in the northern portion of the Northern Territory
 Pituophis melanoleucus, a.k.a. the pine snake, a harmless colubrid species found in North America

Animal common name disambiguation pages